Hyeseong is the "1.5th" "special" studio album by South Korean singer Younha. It was released on October 23, 2007, through Seoul Records. It is the remake of her Japanese debut studio album Go! Younha with a few track list changes.

Track listing

References

External links
 Younha Official Website (Korean language)

2007 albums
Korean-language albums
Younha albums